Boonthung Srisung (Thai: บุญถึง ศรีสังข์; Thai nickname: Tay; born 30 May 1981 in Buriram Province, Thailand) is a Thai long-distance runner. Srisung graduated from the Institute of Physical Education in Sukhothai, Thailand, and is currently coached by Nikorn Kansong.

He qualified for the 2016 Summer Olympics in Rio de Janeiro, and represented Thailand in the men's marathon. He finished in 133rd place with a time of 2:37.46. He was the flag bearer for Thailand during the closing ceremony.

At the 2013 Southeast Asian Games he won silver medals in both 5000 metres and 10,000 metres.

Personal bests
Outdoor
1500m – 3:52.80 (Incheon 2005)
3000m – 8:17.89 (Bangkok 2007)
5000m – 14:10.56 (Izmir 2005)
10,000m – 29:29.59 (Manila 2005)
3000m Steeplechase - 9:24.25 (Chiang Rai 2018)
Half Marathon – 1:07:35 (Sydney 2006)
Marathon – 2:24:01 (Houston 2016)

Indoor
3000m – 8:10.39 (Bangkok 2005)

References

External links

1981 births
Living people
Boonthung Srisung
Boonthung Srisung
Athletes (track and field) at the 2016 Summer Olympics
Athletes (track and field) at the 2006 Asian Games
Athletes (track and field) at the 2014 Asian Games
Athletes (track and field) at the 2018 Asian Games
Boonthung Srisung
Southeast Asian Games medalists in athletics
Boonthung Srisung
Boonthung Srisung
Boonthung Srisung
Competitors at the 2007 Southeast Asian Games
Competitors at the 2009 Southeast Asian Games
Competitors at the 2013 Southeast Asian Games
Competitors at the 2015 Southeast Asian Games
Boonthung Srisung
Boonthung Srisung
Boonthung Srisung